The Ministry of Foreign Affairs of the Republic of Zimbabwe is a cabinet ministry of Zimbabwe, responsible for conducting foreign relations of the country.

The current Minister of Foreign Affairs and International Trade is Frederick Shava. He was appointed by President of Zimbabwe, Emmerson Mnangagwa, being sworn in on 2 March 2021.

Color key
Political parties

Other factions

List of ministers
The following is a list of Foreign Ministers of Zimbabwe and its historical antecedents since 1953:

See also
Ministry of External Affairs (Rhodesia)

References

External links

Government of Zimbabwe
Foreign relations of Zimbabwe
Zimbabwe